The Europe Zone was the unique zone within Group 3 of the regional Davis Cup competition in 2019. The zone's competition was held in round robin format in Athens, Greece, from 11 to 14 September 2019.

Participating nations

Draw
Date: 11–14 September

Location: Tatoi Club, Athens, Greece

Format: Round-robin basis.

Seeding

 1Davis Cup Rankings as of 4 February 2019

Round Robin

Pool A

Pool B

Standings are determined by: 1. number of wins; 2. number of matches; 3. in two-team ties, head-to-head records; 4. in three-team ties, (a) percentage of sets won (head-to-head records if two teams remain tied), then (b) percentage of games won (head-to-head records if two teams remain tied), then (c) Davis Cup rankings.

Playoffs

Round Robin

Pool A

Luxembourg vs. Greece

Poland vs. Monaco

Luxembourg vs. Monaco

Poland vs. Greece

Luxembourg vs. Poland

Monaco vs. Greece

Pool B

Estonia vs. North Macedonia

Latvia vs. Montenegro

Estonia vs. Montenegro

Latvia vs. North Macedonia

Estonia vs. Latvia

Montenegro vs. North Macedonia

Playoffs

1st to 2nd playoff

Poland vs. Estonia

3rd to 4th playoff

Greece vs. Latvia

5th to 8th playoff

Monaco vs. North Macedonia

5th to 8th playoff

Luxembourg vs. Montenegro

References

External links
Official Website

Europe Zone Group III
Davis Cup Europe/Africa Zone